Yehezkel Braun (January 18, 1922 – August 27, 2014) was an Israeli composer. Darryl Lyman: Great Jews in Music. J. D. Publishers, Middle Village, N.Y, 1986.

Biography
Yehezkel Braun was born in Breslau, Germany. The family moved to  Mandate Palestine when he was two. He grew up surrounded by Jewish and East-Mediterranean traditional music that influenced his later compositions. 

Braun was a graduate of the Israel Academy of Music and held a master's degree in Classical Studies from Tel Aviv University.

In 1975, Braun studied Gregorian chant with Dom Jean Claire at the Benedictine monastery of Solesmes in France. His main academic interests were traditional Jewish melodies and Gregorian chants. He lectured on these and other subjects at universities and congresses in England, France, the United States and Germany. Yehezkel Braun was Professor Emeritus at Tel Aviv University.

Braun died in Tel Aviv on August 27, 2014. He was 92.

Awards and recognition
In 2001, Braun was awarded the Israel Prize, for music.

See also
Music of Israel

References

External links 
 
 

1922 births
2014 deaths
Silesian Jews
Israel Prize in music recipients
Israeli composers
Jewish Israeli musicians
Academic staff of Tel Aviv University
Tel Aviv University alumni
People from the Province of Lower Silesia
German emigrants to Mandatory Palestine
Jewish classical composers